Adelchi is the second tragedy written by Alessandro Manzoni. It was first published in 1822.

The main character is Adelchis, a Longobard prince torn by the inner conflict between his father Desiderio's will and his own desire for peace. Adelchis is the son of the last Lombard King, Desiderius. The action takes place between 772 and 774, the latter being the year in which Charlemagne, also a protagonist in the tragedy, brought about the end of the Lombard Kingdom.

It was staged by Vittorio Gassman in 1960 and Carmelo Bene in 1984.

References

Sources
 Banham, Martin, ed. 1998. The Cambridge Guide to Theatre. Cambridge: Cambridge UP. .

1822 plays
Italian plays
Plays set in the Middle Ages
Plays set in France
Cultural depictions of Charlemagne
Alessandro Manzoni